CSX Transportation's Vitis Subdivision is a railroad line running along CSX's AR Line in Central Florida from Richland to Lakeland for a total of 19.7 miles. The Vitis Subdivision serves as a connection between CSX's two main lines in Florida, the A Line and the S Line. Its connection with the S Line (which is a detour of the original S Line) at the north end is known as Vitis Junction. The connection with the A Line at the south end is known as Lakeland Junction.

History

The tracks that are today the Vitis Subdivision began operation in September 1885. They were built by the South Florida Railroad as part of their Pemberton Ferry branch (CSX's detoured S Line from Vitis Junction north to Owensboro is also part of the Pemberton Ferry branch). CSX's A Line was originally the South Florida Railroad's main line. The line was narrow gauge when originally built. It was fully converted to standard gauge on August 7, 1891.

The Plant System, which the South Florida Railroad was part of, was bought out by the Atlantic Coast Line Railroad in 1902.  In the Atlantic Coast Line era, the line would serve as the southernmost segment of their line from Du Pont, Georgia to Lakeland via High Springs (R Line), which would be complete by 1913.  The Atlantic Coast Line became the Seaboard Coast Line Railroad in 1967, which then became CSX Transportation in 1986.

The Atlantic Coast Line's Lakeland Yard was located in what is now Bonnet Springs Park just northwest of Lakeland Junction.  Lakeland Yard closed in the 1980s and traffic was then relocated to nearby Winston Yard just four miles west of Lakeland Junction on the A Line.

From 1990 to 2004, Amtrak operated service on the Vitis Subdivision which also ran on the S Line further north.  This service was operated by the Silver Star, Silver Palm, and the Palmetto at various times through this period.

See also
 List of CSX Transportation lines

References

CSX Transportation lines
Florida railroads
Central Florida
Transportation in Polk County, Florida
Transportation in Pasco County, Florida